Low-pressure hydrocephalus (LPH) is a condition whereby ventricles are enlarged and the individual experiences severe dementia, inability to walk, and incontinence – despite very low intracranial pressure (ICP). 

Low pressure hydrocephalus appears to be a more acute form of normal pressure hydrocephalus.  If not diagnosed in a timely fashion, the individual runs the risk of remaining in the low pressure hydrocephalic state or LPHS.  Shunt revisions, even when they are set to drain at a low ICP, are not always effective.  The pressure in the brain does not get high enough to allow the cerebrospinal fluid to drain in a shunt system, therefore the shunt is open, but malfunctioning in LPH. In cases of LPH, chronic infarcts can also develop along the corona radiata in response to the tension in the brain as the ventricles increase in size.  Certain causes of LPH include trauma, tumor, bleeding, inflammation of the lining of the brain, whole brain radiation, as well as other brain pathology that affects the compliance of the brain parenchyma. One treatment for the LPHS is an external ventricular drain (EVD) set at negative pressures.  According to Pang & Altschuler et al., a controlled, steady, negative pressure siphoning with EVD, carefully monitored with partial computer tomography scans is a safe and effective way of treating LPH.  In their experience, this approach helps restore the brain mantle.  They caution against dropping or raising the pressure of the EVD too quickly as it increases risk and also destabilizes the ventricles.  Getting the ventricles smaller, is the initial step, stabilising them is the second step before placing a shunt – which is the final step in therapy.  Any variation from this formula can lead to an ineffective, yet patent shunt system, despite a low-pressure setting.  Care should be taken with EVD therapy, as mismanagement of the EVD can lead to long-term permanent complications and brain injury.

References

Further reading
 
 
 

Central nervous system disorders